Marangua is a genus of flies in the family Stratiomyidae.

Distribution
Tanzania.

Species
Marangua pygmaea Lindner, 1960

References

Stratiomyidae
Brachycera genera
Taxa named by Erwin Lindner
Diptera of Africa
Endemic fauna of Tanzania